The  National Statistical Office of Papua New Guinea  is a national institute of Papua New Guinea, which is dedicated to collecting socio-economic data in the country. It collects data on demographics, population, climatology, industry, tourism, education and employment etc.

External links
 www.nso.gov.pg - site ceased to function in January 2012 and re-designed and developed again in 2015 by its ICT Branch

Papua